Riot Girls is a 2019 Canadian post-apocalyptic science fiction film, directed by Jovanka Vuckovic.

Plot
Set in the town of Potter's Bluff, where a mysterious virus has killed all  the adults and left society entirely in the hands of rival teen gangs, the film stars Madison Iseman and Paloma Kwiatkowski as Nat and Scratch, a lesbian couple who must go behind enemy lines to rescue Nat's brother Jack (Alexandre Bourgeois) after he is captured by the wealthy and powerful West Side gang led by jock Jeremy (Munro Chambers).

Cast
Madison Iseman as Nat
Paloma Kwiatkowski as Scratch
Alexandre Bourgeois as Nat's brother Jack
Munro Chambers as Jeremy
Jenny Raven as Caine
Atticus Mitchell as Cracker
Carson MacCormac as Spit

Production and filming
In September 2016, Clique Pictures announced that Jovanka Vuckovic was to direct the apocalyptic horror film. With financing procured from Telefilm Canada, Head Gear Films, the Northern Ontario Heritage Fund, the Ontario Media Development Corporation, Search Engine Films, Urban Post Production, She Wolf Films, and the Harold Greenberg Fund, the cast was announced in October 2017, as well as the start of filming.

The film was shot in Parry Sound, Hamilton, Ontario and Toronto. XYZ Films handled sales for North America, with Alliance Media Partners in charge of international. In January 2019, Cranked Up Films acquired the U.S. distribution rights from XYZ Films.

Award nominations
The film received five Canadian Screen Award nominations at the 8th Canadian Screen Awards in 2020, for Achievement in Art Direction/Production Design (Jennifer Morden and Danny Haeberlin), Achievement in Make-Up (Brandi Boulet and Chris Bridges), Achievement in Hair (Dann Campbell), Achievement in Music – Original Score (Peter Chapman), and Achievement in Music – Original Song (Peter Chapman and Leslie Seaforth for "We Run the World").

References

External links
 
 
 

2019 films
2019 science fiction films
2019 LGBT-related films
Canadian LGBT-related films
LGBT-related science fiction films
Lesbian-related films
English-language Canadian films
Films shot in Ontario
2010s English-language films
Canadian post-apocalyptic films
2010s Canadian films